Jana Toepel (born July 7, 1978 in Perkiomenville, Pennsylvania) is a former field hockey midfielder from the United States, who made her international senior debut for the Women's National Team in 1999. The former student of the University of North Carolina was a member of the team, that won the silver medal at the 1999 Pan American Games.

International Senior Tournaments
 1999 – Pan American Games, Winnipeg, Canada (2nd)
 2000 – Olympic Qualifying Tournament, Milton Keynes, England (6th)

References

External links
 Biography at CSTV

1978 births
Living people
American female field hockey players
People from Montgomery County, Pennsylvania
University of North Carolina at Chapel Hill alumni
Pan American Games medalists in field hockey
Pan American Games silver medalists for the United States
Medalists at the 1999 Pan American Games
Field hockey players at the 1999 Pan American Games
21st-century American women